George Cambridge can refer to:

Prince George of Wales, previously sometimes known by this name
Prince George, Duke of Cambridge
George Cambridge, 2nd Marquess of Cambridge
George Cambridge (priest), archdeacon of Middlesex